Walltown is a rural unincorporated community in eastern Casey County, Kentucky, United States. It was named for Robert Wall, who purchased 700 acres (2.8 km) of land in the area in 1807. Its post office operated from 1886 to 1907.

References

Unincorporated communities in Casey County, Kentucky
Unincorporated communities in Kentucky